The 14th Golden Horse Awards (Mandarin:第14屆金馬獎) took place on October 30, 1977, at Zhongshan Hall in Taipei, Taiwan.

Winners and nominees 
Winners are listed first, highlighted in boldface.

References

14th
1977 film awards
1977 in Taiwan